A Conservative Party of Ontario leadership election (formally the convention of the Liberal-Conservative Association of Ontario) was held on the week of May 25, 1936 at the Royal York Hotel in Toronto culminating in a ballot for leader on May 28, 1936 to replace retiring Conservative leader and former premier George S. Henry, who had resigned after his party lost the 1934 provincial election to Mitchell Hepburn's Liberals. The party selected federal Member of Parliament Earl Rowe on the second ballot. The results for the first ballot were not originally going to be read out but various delegates shouted from the floor demanding the results and the vote totals were read out.

First ballot

ROWE, Earl 782
DREW, George 480
STEWART, William James 157
MACAULAY, Leopold 90
HEIGHINGTON, Wilfrid 70
ACRES, Adam 47
ELLIS, Arthur 10

(Ellis eliminated, Stewart, Macaulay, Heighington, Acres withdraw. Stewart yells into an open microphone that he endorses Drew after the convention votes not to give withdrawing candidates a chance to speak before the second ballot.)

Second ballot

ROWE, Earl 1005
DREW, George 660

See also:  Progressive Conservative Party of Ontario leadership conventions

1936
1936 elections in Canada
Conservative Party of Ontario leadership election